Oryctopterus is a genus of Orthopteran insects in the subfamily Stenopelmatinae and is the only genus in the tribe Oryctopterini.  Species have been recorded from India and Sri Lanka.

Species
The Orthoptera Species File lists:
 Oryctopterus lagenipes (Karny, 1935) - type species (as Oryctopus lagenipes Karny, locality Sri Lanka)
 Oryctopterus varuna Hiremath & Prathapan, 2021
 Oryctopterus yeshwanthi Hiremath & Prathapan, 2021

References

External links

Ensifera genera
Stenopelmatoidea
Orthoptera of Asia